Ayumi Hamasaki Arena Tour 2009 A: Next Level is the twelfth concert tour DVD by the Japanese pop singer Ayumi Hamasaki. It was released on April 14, 2010, the same day as the release of Rock 'n' Roll Circus. On the Oricon weekly chart, it peaked at second place and is currently still charting. The tour consisted of 32 shows across Japan and played to over 300,000 fans.

Tour dates

Track list

Disc 1 
Pieces of SEVEN
Rule
UNITE!
Disco-munication
EnergizE
Sunrise 〜LOVE is ALL〜
Load of the SHUGYO
LOVE 'n' HATE
identity
In The Corner
HOPE or PAIN
GREEN
Days
evolution
SIGNAL
rollin'
Sparkle
Bridge to the sky
NEXT LEVEL

Disc 2 
Curtain call
Sunset 〜LOVE is ALL〜
everywhere nowhere
Humming 7/4
Boys & Girls
MY ALL

Disc 3 
MC Time
Screen Videos (2 titles)

References 

Ayumi Hamasaki video albums
2010 video albums
Live video albums
2010 live albums